Read Between the Lines is the second studio album by American country music artist Aaron Tippin. The album features Tippin's first number-one single, "There Ain't Nothin' Wrong With the Radio", as well as the hits "My Blue Angel", "I Was Born with a Broken Heart", and "I Wouldn't Have It Any Other Way". "I Was Born with a Broken Heart" was previously recorded by Josh Logan on his 1988 album Somebody Paints the Wall, from which it was also released as a single. David Ball also released the song on his 1989 self-titled debut album, although the album was not released until 1994.

Track listing

Personnel
Stuart Duncan – fiddle on "I Wouldn't Have It Any Other Way" and "Read Between the Lines"
Dan Galysh – steel guitar on "I Miss Misbehavin'"
Sonny Garrish – steel guitar
Steve Gibson – electric guitar and six-string bass guitar on "The Sound of Your Goodbye"
Emory Gordy Jr. – bass guitar
Rob Hajacos – fiddle
John Barlow Jarvis – keyboards
Larrie Londin – drums, percussion
Patty Loveless – background vocals on "These Sweet Dreams"
Brent Mason – electric guitar, six-string bass guitar
Andy Most – electric rhythm guitar on "My Blue Angel" and "I Was Born with a Broken Heart"
Alan O'Bryant – background vocals
Steve Thomas – fiddle on "There Ain't Nothin' Wrong with the Radio", "The Sound of Your Goodbye", and "I Miss Misbehavin'"
Aaron Tippin - lead vocals
Biff Watson – acoustic guitar

Chart performance

References

1992 albums
RCA Records albums
Aaron Tippin albums
Albums produced by Emory Gordy Jr.